Leatherface is a character from The Texas Chainsaw Massacre series. He first appeared in The Texas Chain Saw Massacre (1974) as the mentally disabled member of a family of deranged cannibals, featuring his now iconic face masks and chainsaw. Created by Tobe Hooper and Kim Henkel, Leatherface was partially inspired by the crimes of Wisconsin murderer Ed Gein, in addition to confessions by serial killer Elmer Wayne Henley. The character has subsequently been represented in various other media, including novels, video games, and comic books; appearing in all nine films in the series, though rarely as the main antagonist.

The role of the character is well known for being physically and emotionally challenging, with actors portraying the character not only needing to perform the necessary stunts associated with the role, but also give emotional depth to the character while wearing a mask that greatly obscured most of their features. Icelandic-American actor  Gunnar Hansen would be the first and most well-known actor to portray the character, later going on to become a vocal advocate for the character. Since Hansen's portrayal of Leatherface, numerous other actors and stuntmen have assumed the role of the character throughout the course of the series.

The character's physical appearance and personality have gone through many transformations over the years, with various writers and special makeup effects artists leaving their mark on the character and his design. Unique among horror villains, in which most antagonists of the genre are usually classified as sadistic or evil; Leatherface is characterized as committing his brutal acts as a means of following his family's orders, while also killing out of fear. Leatherface has gradually become a widely recognized figure in popular culture, gaining a reputation as a cultural icon within the horror genre. He has been credited as one of the most influential characters of the slasher genre for inspiring the stereotype of the hulking, masked, and silent killer, predating and even influencing horror icons such as Michael Myers and Jason Voorhees. Leatherface has since been parodied and referenced in novels, feature films, games, and television series; in addition to being an inspiration for many artistic outlets, fictional characters, heavy metal bands, and wrestling gimmicks.

Appearances

Leatherface is the only character to appear in all nine films in the Texas Chainsaw Massacre franchise, with later films exploring different aspects of him, while changing the overall history of the character and his family. Following his first appearance on the silver screen, Leatherface has appeared in various other entertainment mediums, which include comic book lines, novelizations, and video games; each appearance expanding upon the universe created by the films.

Films

Leatherface made his first appearance in the original The Texas Chain Saw Massacre on October 11, 1974. In the film, Leatherface (Gunnar Hansen) and his family, former slaughterhouse workers, capture and murder a group of teenagers one-by-one as they trespass upon their property. In the end, the sole survivor Sally Hardesty (Marilyn Burns), escapes as Leatherface angrily flails his chainsaw in the blazing sun. The character's second appearance was in the 1986 sequel, The Texas Chainsaw Massacre 2. The film reveals that Leatherface (Bill Johnson) and his family, now identified under the last name Sawyer, have been on the run since Sally escaped and alerted the police. Leatherface finds himself attracted to Vanita "Stretch" Brock (Caroline Williams), a radio disc jockey who recorded Leatherface and his brother (Bill Moseley) murdering a couple of teens over the radio airwaves and refuses to kill her when Drayton (Jim Siedow) orders him to do so. Leatherface and most of his family are seemingly killed when a grenade recovered from the Hitchhiker's preserved corpse goes off prematurely.

In Leatherface: The Texas Chainsaw Massacre III (1990), Leatherface (R.A. Mihailoff) appears alongside new family members as they capture a young couple, Michelle (Kate Hodge) and her boyfriend Ryan (William Butler), when they get lost on the back roads of Texas. When Michelle escapes, Leatherface chases her into the nearby marshlands. Michelle manages to gain the upper hand, knocking Leatherface unconscious and leaving him to drown as he sinks into the bog. He is revealed to have survived, emerging from the bog with his chainsaw. His fourth appearance in Texas Chainsaw Massacre: The Next Generation (1995) is unconnected to any of the previous entries. In it, a group of teenagers attending their high school prom stumble across Leatherface and his family. All but one are killed, with Jenny (Renée Zellweger) escaping to a nearby hospital.

In the 2003 remake of the original film, Leatherface (Andrew Bryniarski), given the real name Thomas Brown Hewitt, torments and murders a group of teenagers alongside his family. One of the teenagers, Erin (Jessica Biel), escapes the family, severing his arm with a cleaver in order to help facilitate her attempt. Surviving in spite of his severe injury, Leatherface goes on to murder several law enforcement officers investigating his family home in the aftermath of Erin's escape. Leatherface's appearance in the prequel of the 2003 remake The Texas Chainsaw Massacre: The Beginning (2006), reveals the origins of the character while explaining the iconic chainsaw and his family's cannibalism. Throughout the course of the film, Leatherface (Bryniarski) and his family torture and murder two couples as they drive through Travis County, Texas.

Texas Chainsaw 3D (2013), a direct sequel to the original film, ignores the continuity of the previous sequels. Now identified as Jedidiah Sawyer (Dan Yeager), the film picks up immediately after The Texas Chain Saw Massacre, where Sally escapes and informs the locals of the atrocities committed by the Sawyers. After a group of local vigilantes burn down the Sawyer house and kill most of his family, Leatherface spends the next 40 years in seclusion. It is only when his newly discovered cousin, Heather (Alexandra Daddario) arrives that Leatherface emerges to commit a new string of murders. A prequel to the original film, titled Leatherface, was released in October 2017. It centers on the youngest member of the Sawyer family, Jedidiah (Sam Strike), being institutionalized after his family murdered the daughter of law enforcement officer Hal Hartman (Stephen Dorff). He escapes the mental hospital years later with three other inmates and a hostage nurse, leaving a trail of bodies as they are pursued by the deranged Hartman. Jedidiah suffers extensive trauma at Hartman's hands, until the other Sawyer family members rescue him, taking Hartman and the nurse captive. Goaded by the family's matriarch Verna (Lili Taylor), the mentally and physically damaged Jedidiah slaughters Hartman and the nurse with a gifted chainsaw. Jedediah later crafts his first face mask out of Hartman and the nurse's flesh, which he now wears to cover his disfigured face.

Texas Chainsaw Massacre (2022) would also serve as a direct sequel to the original film. Picking up several decades after the original film, the story focuses on an aging Leatherface (Mark Burnham), living in relative peace with an elderly woman named Virginia "Ginny" McCumber (Alice Krige). When an altercation with a group of young adults leaves Ginny dead from a heart attack, he finally snaps. Fashioning a new mask out of Ginny's face before retrieving his old chainsaw; he begins slaughtering members of the group, gaining the attention of  Texas Ranger Sally Hardesty (Olwen Fouéré), the sole survivor of his original killing spree. After slaughtering many people, including Sally, Leatherface returns to the house where the original 'massacre' began.

Literature
Leatherface's first foray away from the silver screen was in 1991, with Northstar Comics' four-issue miniseries Leatherface, a loose adaptation of the 1990 film Leatherface: The Texas Chainsaw Massacre III, written by novelist Morton Castle. The miniseries followed the basic storyline of the film, with additional insight into Leatherface's mental state, as well as modifying character and plot elements to be different from that of the film. Working from the original script and the heavily modified final film, Castle was given reign to "write the story the way it should have been told", without censorship from the MPAA. In 1995, Nancy A. Collins wrote a three issue, non-canonical miniseries involving a crossover between Jason Voorhees of Friday the 13th series and Leatherface. The story involves Jason stowing away aboard a train after being released from Crystal Lake when the area is drained due to heavy toxic waste dumping. Jason meets Leatherface, who adopts him into his family after the two become friends. Eventually, they turn on each other.

Leatherface made his literary debut in the 2004 novelization of the 2003 remake, written by Stephen Hand. The novel was based on one of the film's earlier drafts, containing plot points that were discarded from the film's final draft. These included the main character Erin being pregnant during the events of the film, and Leatherface's murder of Jedidiah, one of his younger family members who had decided to help Erin escape. That same year, Hand would publish Texas Chainsaw Massacre II: Skinfreak. Set after the events of the first film while also containing significant backstory into its characters, the novel would lend further insight into Leatherface's origins, differing significantly from the film's prequel released three years later. A second novelization, also published by Hand, based on the film's prequel. The novelization would adhere to the film's script, ignoring details of the character's origins previously put forth in Skinfreak.

In 2005, Avatar Press began publishing a comic book series based on the 2003 remake. Leatherface made his official appearance in The Texas Chainsaw Massacre Special #1, a one-shot comic, centering on a group of three escaped convicts who rob the Hewitt family General store, bringing them into direct conflict with Leatherface and his family. Next, he appears in Avatar's The Texas Chainsaw Massacre: The Grind, a three-issue miniseries where Leatherface and the rest of the Hewitt family terrorize and kill a group of choir students and teachers whose bus breaks down near the Hewitt residence. Leatherface appears in Avatar's final one-shot comic, The Texas Chainsaw Massacre Fearbook, which features Leatherface killing a group of cross-country travelers, with the exception of one girl, who is forced to wear the face of her dead boyfriend and dance with Leatherface.

From January to June 1, 2007, WildStorm began publishing a six-issue series titled "Americanivore". Set one year after the events of the 2003 film, Leatherface and his family are hunted by the FBI led by agent Baines who seeks to avenge the death of his niece Pepper. To make matters worse, Leatherface is also being tracked by a television news crew who attempts to capture him on film. The series climaxes in a bloody standoff, leaving most of the news crew and pursuing agents dead, and the sole surviving crew member escaping with Leatherface's chainsaw. On July 18, 2007, the company released The Texas Chainsaw Massacre: About A Boy, which chronicles Leatherface's journey through adolescence, and what it was like growing up with kids his own age. In Wildstorm's one-shot The Texas Chainsaw Massacre: Cut!, Leatherface comes across a group of independent filmmakers, thirty years after the events of the 2003 remake, who are making a documentary about the Hewitt family. A three-issue limited series, titled Raising Cain was published by WildStorm in late 2008. The story would center on twins Cain and Abel, who are born into the Hewitt family, with their mother wanting her children to escape the family's blood-soaked heritage, bringing her and the twins into conflict with Leatherface and the rest of his family.

Leatherface made a brief appearance in New Line Cinema's Tales of Horror, published by WildStorm, which features Leatherface and the Hewitt family meeting a traveling salesman who tries to sell them chainsaws.

Other appearances
Leatherface made his video game debut in the controversial 1982 video game adaption of the first film released on the Atari 2600 by Wizard Video. In the game, the player assumes the role of Leatherface as he attempts to murder trespassers, all the while avoiding obstacles such as fences and cow skulls. Leatherface also appears as a playable character in the fighting game Mortal Kombat X, as a downloadable content bonus character. He became a downloadable playable killer for Dead by Daylight in 2017, utilizing his signature chainsaw and sledgehammer as weapons. The events of the game are set after Sally's escape in The Texas Chain Saw Massacre, as he begins to panic at the thought of his family's atrocities being exposed to the police. In the midst of his trepidation, he is taken to the universe of Dead by Daylight by some unknown force. The character is set to appear in the upcoming survival horror game of the same name, developed by Gun Media, and is set several years before the events of the original film.

Concept and creation

Developing a slasher
Originally created by Tobe Hooper and Kim Henkel, the concept for the character that would later be known as Leatherface first came about while Hooper was working as an assistant film director at the University of Texas at Austin and as a documentary cameraman during the late 1960s. During that period Hooper had grown increasingly disillusioned by what he referred to as the "lack of sentimentality and the brutality of things" witnessing the graphic and dispassionate violence depicted in the news at the time. This led Hooper to believe that "man was the real monster here, just wearing a different face", a belief that he would instill into Leatherface through the character's now iconic face mask. Co-creator Henkel would later state in a 1996 interview that he felt that making Leatherface a human being instead of a typical monster made him more frightening, as he would elaborate "the only genuinely frightening thing to people is [other] people". 

Certain elements for Leatherface were inspired by the crimes of Wisconsin murderer and grave-robber Ed Gein who would also inspire other horror films such as Psycho (1960) and The Silence of the Lambs (1991). In later interviews, Hooper claimed to have heard stories of Gein from relatives who had lived nearby, though Hooper would admit he did not know it was Gein until after the film's release. One detail from Gein's crimes that Hooper found particularly disturbing, and a trait that he and his fellow co-writer would instill into the character, was Gein's penchant for crafting and wearing human flesh as masks; a concept that first made its appearance onto the silver screen in Deranged (1974), a film directly inspired by Gein, released eight months prior to Hooper's film. Hooper would also claim in later years of an additional source of inspiration for the face mask taken from an event that occurred in his early years of college. While at a Halloween party, a friend of his who had been a pre-med student at the time, had arrived at the party wearing the face of a cadaver as a 'joke'. Hooper was deeply shaken by the incident, later confiding to actor William Butler about the event, which he would call 'the most disturbing thing I have ever seen'. The confessions and crimes of serial killer Elmer Wayne Henley, who committed a string of murders under the guidance of rapist and fellow serial killer Dean Corll, were additional points of inspiration while developing both Leatherface and the members of the family; noting Henley's calm demeanor when confessing to his crimes were a sort of "moral schizophrenia" that was later built into Leatherface's character. While brainstorming the character's design, both filmmakers felt that Leatherface should be a large, menacing figure whose behavior was like that of a child; with Hooper citing the cartoon character Baby Huey as a major source of inspiration for the character's behavior.

Early renditions of the script included a more detailed backstory to the character, explaining many aspects of the character. In the original script, Leatherface was depicted as a victim of torture during his childhood, with his face possibly skinned off. Script rewrites would remove this aspect of the character, in favor of leaving him undefined, while adding the concept of alternating personalities that changed depending on each mask he wore. Henkel and Hooper further developed the notion of the character being mentally disabled, affecting his ability to think and speak in a rational and coherent manner. Glimpses into this deteriorated mental state were depicted in the form of incomprehensible gibberish on two separate occasions in the film; once when Leatherface attempts to "speak" to Dreyton (credited in the film as the "Old Man"), and the second occurring the famous dinner scene. Leatherface was originally scripted to have several lines of dialogue in his conversation with Drayton where he reassures him that everything is 'ok'. Filmmakers were dissatisfied with the resulting scene as it was written, with Hansen noting it made the character seem "too rational", and was rewritten to fit the filmmaker's vision of a demented and mentally-disabled maniac. The idea for the character's trademark chainsaw came to Hooper while he was in the hardware section of a busy store, as the frustrated director contemplated how to speed his way through a large crowd.

Men behind the mask

The role of Leatherface is well known for being physically and emotionally challenging, with actors not only needing to perform the necessary stunts associated with the role under grueling working conditions, but also give emotional depth to the character behind a costume obscuring most their features.

Icelandic-American actor Gunnar Hansen was the first to portray the role of Leatherface, auditioning for the role after hearing from a friend about a group of filmmakers that were making a horror film and needed someone to portray a 'crazed murderer'. While the audition went well, with the filmmakers being impressed with the actor's imposing figure, Hansen was told someone was already hired for the role. Hansen was contacted by filmmakers a week later, as the original actor turn out to be an alcoholic who refused cooperate, although Hooper would reveal to Hansen that he had been his first choice for the role. During his first meeting with the filmmakers after being cast, Hooper would explain the character in detail for Hansen; describing Leatherface as being severely mentally impaired, and insane, which made the character violent and unpredictable. In order to prepare for the role, Hansen experimented with different vocal tones and pitches in order to find the right voice for the character. Hansen also visited a special needs school in Austin, observing how the students moved and spoke, in an attempt to find the proper movement and behavior.

The role was both physically and psychologically taxing for the actor, having to work up to sixteen hours a day seven days a week in extremely hot and humid weather conditions. Throughout the twenty-eight days of production, Hansen was separated from the other actors, as the filmmakers wanted the actors fear of the character to be genuine. Filmmakers cautioned Hansen to not wash his costume or remove the mask during filming, for fear of possibly damaging them, as they did not have enough funds to replace them. The mask itself greatly impaired the actor's ability to see, as it had eyeholes on the design were too small for Hansen to see through clearly. While filming the scene where Leatherface first appears and kills Kirk (William Vail), Hansen unintentionally gave the actor a black eye after hitting him in the face with a fake sledgehammer. A fully functioning chainsaw, borrowed from one of the locals, was used during production; for certain sequences, the blade was removed, and a piece of duct tape was also used to cover the brand logo. In the scenes where Leatherface was cutting objects with his chainsaw, the power tool would have teeth. Hansen stated in 2013 that he didn't realize the full extent of that danger until he was chopping wood whilst living in the woods after the film's release. The extreme temperatures and grueling physical demands were a source of great agitation for the actor, whom at one point during filming, had become so frustrated while shooting the "Dinner Scene" when the tubes of fake blood didn't work, that he had cut open actress Marilyn Burns finger just to get the scene over with. Hansen also recalled that during the scene where the Hitchhiker threatens Sally with a hammer, the exhausted and borderline delirious actor went temporarily mad. The infamous final scene where Leatherface twirls around in a rage with his chainsaw, referred to as the "Chainsaw Dance", was partially improvised on the day of shooting. As the actor later recalled, the scene came from all his frustration during filming, which he admitted came out in the final shot in the film with Leatherface madly swinging the chainsaw around, jokingly referring to it as a last-ditch effort to 'kill' the director. Hansen later returned to the series in 2013, as Boss Sawyer in Texas Chainsaw 3D.

Bill Johnson was hired to portray Leatherface in the film's sequel, The Texas Chainsaw Massacre 2. Originally Hansen was in negotiations to reprise his role in the film, although he opted out when Cannon Films refused to offer him any more than union scale. Johnson, having not seen the original film before, viewed the film the day before he auditioned for the role. Johnson would recall being impressed by the original film, calling it 'eerie, very deeply disturbing, unsettling, and unnerving, but also inspiring'. Johnson felt free to put his own spin on the character, opting to "stay out of Gunnar's shoes" while making the character his own. Knowing the physical demands required for the role, Johnson strove to do the best acting job he could for the character, taking inspiration from the dedication of the film's cast and crew. Johnson remained in character throughout production, spending much of his time in his trailer preparing each scene that he was in. Stuntman Bob Elmore would also be hired, alongside Tom Morga as Johnson's stunt doubles. Elmore would perform many of the physical scenes for the character including the chainsaw battle with Dennis Hopper, and the overall stunt portion of the infamous "chainsaw love" scene. During the filming of the latter, a real chainsaw with teeth was used, which made actress Caroline Williams extremely nervous about performing in the scene. Elmore eventually was able to reassure her of the safety of the stunt. Morga would only perform part of the stunts required for the opening bridge scene. 

Filming would be particularly grueling for Johnson, Elmore, and the rest of the cast and crew, as they had to deal with extreme temperatures of up to 125 degrees while in a heavily insulated costume that only exposed the eyes and mouth. Johnson would later catch pneumonia once filming had wrapped. Elmore would recount the entire experience as being incredibly taxing, both physically and mentally, with Elmore having repeated clashes with the film's stunt coordinator Jim "Jimmy" Stephan, who regularly berated and verbally abused Elmore and the other stunt performers. The feud would ultimately culminate with Elmore threatening to quit after a stunt rehearsal, in which he pinned Stephan to a wall when the stunt coordinator refused to pull his punches, hitting Elmore repeatedly. Elmore would also sustain a broken wrist while performing in the opening scene. In spite of the hardships during production, the rest of the cast spoke highly of Johnson, commending his dedication towards the role and his ability to imbue the character with emotional depth beyond just portraying him as just a man in a mask. Elmore would also receive praise, which one actor would note "[had] brought this incredible viciousness" into the role.

New Line Cinema would purchase the rights to the franchise, with the intention of returning the series back to its dark and gritty roots, as opposed to the more comedic tone of The Texas Chainsaw Massacre 2. While developing the third film in the series, it was decided that Leatherface should have a more central role as the film's primary star, above that of his cannibalistic family. Actor and former professional wrestler Randal Allen "R.A." Mihailoff was hired for the role in Leatherface: The Texas Chainsaw Massacre III. Mihailoff had originally met with the film's director Jeff Burr while at the University of Southern California where he had worked as a student, having starred in a thesis film directed by Burr, and the two would remain close friends over the years after graduating from University of Southern California. Early on in development, the studio fast-tracked development and shot a teaser trailer, with actor and stunt performer Kane Hodder portraying the character, before a director was even hired.

When Burr was eventually hired on to direct the film, the director initially approached Hansen, who had portrayed the character in the original film. Unfortunately, Hansen was forced to drop out after being unable to conclude a successful deal with New Line Cinema and the role went to Mihailoff, the director's second choice for the role. Hodder was also retained for the film as Mihailoff's stunt double and stunt coordinator. The opening sequence where Leatherface fashions a mask from one of his victims was originally shot with a crew member's hands standing in for Mihailoff's, as the actor was not scheduled to film that day. Unsatisfied with the resulting footage, Burr contacted Mihailoff, who shot the scene with pieces of latex and lunch meat  made to resemble the victim's face. A total of three separate chainsaws were used throughout the course of the film; a fully operational chainsaw was used in scenes that required Mihailoff to cut through objects, while the other two, including a rubber replica of the original and "Excalibur" chainsaw, were used for performing specific stunts and actions. Originally the ending for the film would have been set in the rain with Leatherface riding on horseback while brandishing the "Excalibur" chainsaw, unfortunately, due to budgetary reasons filmmakers were forced to abandon their original plan for the film's ending.

When casting the character for the fourth film in the series, director Kim Henkel wanted an "androgynous type" for the role. To that effect, songwriter and actor Robert "Robbie" Jacks was brought on for the role, with Andy Cockrum, who also portrayed the Stuffed DPS Officer, serving as Jacks stunt double during certain scenes. Special effects artist Joshua "J.M." Logan stated that Jacks was committed to bringing the character to life, spending hours during the make-up process. The Next Generation was a relatively low-budget production, forcing cast members to perform a majority of their own stunts during filming as they could not afford to hire stunt doubles. Stunt doubles would only be used in scenes where cast members could not perform the required action themselves. Fellow cast member Tyler Cone recalled that Jacks had some difficulty with the physicality of the role, particularly in scenes involving Lisa Marie Newmyer and Renée Zellweger. A bruised Jacks and some of the actresses later confronted the producers after a particularly difficult time shooting, with the actor revealing in an interview on Sarah Bernhard's show Reel Wild Cinema, that he felt that the producers had played on the eagerness of the cast in order to get them to participate in hazardous working conditions. Members of the cast and crew would fondly remember Jacks as being a very kind and eager person to work with, Actor John Harrison would later recall Jacks to be a stark contrast to the character he played in the film, calling him a "very kind and gentle spirit".
 

Actor and former bodybuilder Andrew Bryniarski was hired to portray Leatherface in Platinum Dunes's 2003 remake of the original film, and the only character to reappear from the original film. Having previously worked with the film's producer Michael Bay in Pearl Harbor (2001), Bryniarski would learn from Bay that the producer would be working on the remake after meeting up with him during a party. A huge fan of the original film, Bryniarski lobbied for the role of Leatherface, however an unnamed actor had already been chosen for the role at that point. Bryniarski later replaced the actor for the role after an incident during the first day of shooting lead to the original actor being fired. In preparation for the role, the 6 foot 5 inch (1.96 meters), 265-pound actor subsisted on a diet of brisket and white bread in order to gain an additional 35 pounds. Bryniarski would further prepare for the role by researching everything about the original film and the crimes of Gien in order to come up with his own interpretation of the character. Bryniarski would perform most of his own stunt work throughout most of the film's production, describing the experience as particularly challenging, noting the limited visibility and mobility while wearing the costume as well as the extreme temperatures during filming. 

Bryniarski would reprise his role as Leatherface three years later in the film's prequel, The Texas Chainsaw Massacre: The Beginning (2006), as filmmakers were very impressed with the actor's contribution to the character in the previous entry in the franchise. Bryniarski would meet with Hansen out of respect for the actor's work before signing on for the prequel, whom Bryniarski would claim had commended him on his performance while giving the actor his blessing. Bryniarski's hiring for the prequel would mark the only time an actor has portrayed the character in more than one film. Once hired for the prequel, Bryniarski was advised by the filmmakers to forget much of the traits that had defined Leatherface in the previous film, as the prequel would depict a Leatherface that was not fully formed, having yet to embrace his true monstrous nature.

Purchasing rights to the series, Lionsgate wanted to take the franchise in a new direction. When casting for the role, producer Carl Mazzocone made the conscious decision to avoid casting someone physically fit "bodybuilder types", as he not only wanted someone with an imposing stature, but also one that "had a bit of a belly".  Actor Daniel "Dan" Yeager was hired early on in production for the role of Leatherface. John Luessenhop would recollect meeting the 6 foot 6 inch (1.98 m) actor at a holiday party hosted by Yeager's friend and film producer Carl Mazzocone. Luessenhop stated that he could no longer think of another actor to portray the character afterwards. 

A huge fan of the original film, Yeager loved the overall complexity of the character, which he felt was both pitied and feared, describing the character as "a unique combination of love, fear, and violence". Yeager prepared for the role by working out, increaseing his current 250 pound frame to 275 pounds, in order to get the right physicality necessary to portray the character. Yeager would also rewatch the original film, as well as study the script for that film to develop a version of Leatherface that he felt would be a continuation from that chapter of the character's life. As with most actors portraying the character, Yeager realized early on that he had to be conscious of every movement he made, as he often had to act with his entire body while covered in a costume that obscured most of his features. Yeagar came up with an awkward and lumbering stride for Leatherface, as he felt that he [Leatherface] was left with a "compromised physicality" from the leg injury he received in the first film. Yeager admitted that the movements he performed for the character would affect him physically for a while after the shooting had wrapped.| He would credit his previous work as a stage actor, which he felt had helped him to portray the character while wearing the heavy costume.

English actor Sam Strike was cast as the character in the 2017 prequel of the same name, while Boris Kabakchief would portray the character as a child. Strike joined the film after reading the script, which he opined was, for a horror film, very character-driven. He felt that there needed to be a contrast between the two sides of the character, to show how a somewhat kind person can become such a killer: "It could happen to anybody. He had it in him because of his mother, but was at the mercy of his environment." The actor would also integrate aspects from the original film into his performance out of respect, but intended on making the role his own, rather than repeating what came before. To make Jedidiah's transformation into Leatherface more believable, he intentionally tried to gain physical body weight before filming commenced; eating and working out in order to have the look and feel of the character in his early years, which he felt "could take your head off with a slap". Strike would also develop a "battle cry" for the character whenever he lost his temper, as one of the ways the character expressed his rage. The film's directors would commend Strike for his performance and commitment to the character, feeling that the actor brought something "very intense and deeply human" to the character.

In the 2022 entry in the franchise, producers Fede Álvarez and Rodo Sayagues wanted an older Leatherface similar to Michael Myers in the 2018 version of Halloween. Putting out casting calls for the film, producers described their vision for the character, whom they listed under the name "Kenny", as being a 60 year old man who is characterized as having a "big build". 

Actor and filmmaker Mark Burnham was later cast as the character due in part to his imposing stature and physicality, which Álvarez felt was a great continuation of the late Hansen's portrayal of the character. The audition process for Burnam particularly lengthy, which the actor recollected that he sent five different audition tapes to the producers before they had him perform an audition for Álvarez. Burnham was told by producers what they wanted in his performance as something that could mirror Hansen's portrayal of the character "if he had played him today". The actor would credit the lengthy casting process as helping him to prepare and understand the character's motivation and rage. The final shot in the film, a homage to the original "chainsaw dance", was shot in a single take. As director David Blue Garcia would recall, "we gave Mark the freedom to cut loose while we improvised around him". At first, the film's cast were intimidated by the 6ft 7in actor's presence, but would fondly remember Bunham as being a kind and generous person in spite of the grueling conditions he had to work through. Burnham himself would reflect on his time as the character as being a challenging but fun experience.

Design

The physical design for Leatherface has undergone several changes throughout the course of the franchise, with each filmmaker putting their own personal spin on the character. While some of these changes would be subtle, others would be significantly different. For The Texas Chain Saw Massacre, art director Robert A. Burns was given the task of developing Leatherface's design, in addition to designing "Grandpa" and the film's set design. In total, three separate masks were created and used for the film: the "Killing Mask", the "Old Lady Mask" and the "Pretty Woman Mask", the latter of which was affectionately referred to by Kim Henkel as the "Clarabell Clown" mask due to its resemblance to the character from The Howdy Doody Show. The "Killing Mask", described in the script as more like a "close fitting hood" covering the character's entire head, was the first mask Leatherface is shown to wear, while dressed in his signature butcher's outfit. Burns spent the majority of the budget set aside for production design in order to craft the masks used in the film. The masks themselves were created from face molds cast by Dr. W. E. Barnes, a local plastic surgeon who was friends with cast member Marilyn Burns. Molds were made from locals in the area, who had volunteered to have casts taken of their heads, one of the volunteers would be the film's producer Jay Parsley, whose head cast was used to make the "Killing Mask". Once the molds had been set, Burns modified them with the help of Barnes, using dental algenate to create facial expressions for each mask. Burns also experimented with different latex mixtures in order to make the masks appear like layers of dried skin, eventually using a combination of liquid latex and yellow fiberglass insulation. Pieces of the material for each mask were then sewn together with a thin wire, in order to give off a crude and rudimentary look to the designs. A set of dentures was also created for the film, as the script called for a close-up of Leatherface, revealing his teeth had been filed into sharp points. Different outfits were designed for each of the three masks, in order to convey the different personalities associated with each mask. The "Killing Mask" outfit, consisted of Hanson's own shirt, a pair of dress pants, a butcher's apron, and a tie with a scalloped silver curve Burns had painted onto it. The boots were Hanson's old cowboy boots that Burns had modified with insoles and three-inch heels, adding three inches to the actor's imposing stature. Filmmakers intentionally kept Leatherface's design and actor Hansen separate from the rest of the cast, as they felt doing so would allow a more natural tension to be displayed on the screen. As critic Simon Abrams would note, "The amateurish, hand-made quality of Burns's handiwork enhanced the effect of Hansen's ghoulish appearance both for his fellow cast members, who did not see Hansen in full make-up until their characters were assaulted, and for viewers, who believed that this skin-shroud was fashioned by Leatherface out of his victim's body parts."

Make-up effects artist Tom Savini  and Mitch Devane designed the Leatherface mask in Texas Chainsaw Massacre 2, in addition to the design of Chop Top and Grandpa. Both artists envisioned the mask as something created by stitching together different pieces from multiple human faces in a jigsaw-like aesthetic. Devane would be responsible for creating the mask in the film, using a plaster cast of Johnson's head which he then sculpted and modified into the look seen in the film. Johnson was also given blister make-up around his mouth to imply that Leatherface was diseased underneath the mask, in addition to wearing specially-made dentures to mirror the scene of the character in the first film.

The script for the third film in the franchise called for a more disfigured and disturbed look to Leatherface, with the implication that the character suffered from syphilis, which had eaten away much of his face. The design for the mask would be done by KNB EFX Group lead by Robert Kurtzman, with assistance from Greg Nicotero. Both artists were given the instruction to create a version of the Leatherface mask that was 'still identifiable as the original mask but with a modern spin on it'. To that effect, the design team would come up with many different sketches and ideas on what they wanted the mask to look like, some discarded concepts included a "war helmet" created from an animal skull, before finally deciding upon a more "errant teenager" look for the character. Production designer Mick Strawn, who assisted in the design process, recalled the original intention of having Leatherface's mask be a "one-piece", with the entire mask having been created from a single human face. This design aspect was quickly abandoned by the effects crew, who felt that it did not work for the character. Other abandoned ideas would include a scene from one of Schow's earlier drafts, depicting Leatherface removing his mask, revealing his noseless and mangled face. The final mask design, which one media outlet opined as one of the character's most disturbing mask designs, would be more graphic than previous versions of the character's face mask, as it was made by one of Leatherface's more recent victims. Design details such as more jigsaw-style patchwork for the stitches, dried blood around the stitches, and tears, in addition to a wider opening for the mouth, that exposed the character's cracked lips and crooked teeth. Strawn and Nicotero based the design on the concept of Leatherface's mask, intended as a modernization of the "Killing Mask" in the original film, as something that had been made using different pieces of human skin that were torn and sewn in a very patchwork fashion. The mask was sculpted using latex, using a base mold head cast made from the father of fellow KNB EFX member Howard Berger.

The Next Generations iteration of the character was designed by Joshua "J.M." Logan. Logan would admit in an interview years later that he drew inspiration from a conversation he had with Henkel where the director explained the meaning and purpose behind each of the character's masks, and the directors intention to focus more on the character's "confused sexuality". Using this notion that Leatherface had a side of himself that he created to make himself look "beautiful", Logan felt free to explore the more feminine aspects of the character that were barely addressed in the previous films. Designing the character's look for the film would incorporate the idea that Leatherface used more than just a person's face when "becoming" a certain personality, with the design for the Pretty Lady mask including a woman's upper torso and arms. The Pretty Lady mask was designed using molds of the film's production designer Deborah "Debbie" Pastor, who volunteered to have casts done from molds on her head and chest.

For the 2003 version of The Texas Chainsaw Massacre, effects artist Scott Stoddard envisioned Leatherface as an amateur taxidermist, with the mask itself a combination of many different pieces taken off the faces of his victims. As Stoddard would explain, each individual piece of Leatherface's mask was something the character had seen and admired, which was then stitched together in a very crude and rudimentary fashion. Many of the earlier designs took into consideration the age of each individual piece that made up the mask; some pieces were very old and dried up, while other pieces were "months old" and still retained moisture to the point where it made those pieces droop down the face. The final design was deliberately made to look as though it was all stitched together in places that "didn't make any sense", as Stoddard felt that Leatherface would admire a certain part of an individual's face but stitched them together in a way that could fit on him, one such design aspect was the inclusion of the nose and mouth of a woman stitched into the neck portion of the mask. For the exposed portions of the mask's eyes and mouth, Bryniarski would sometimes wear eye liner to darken the area around his eyes to make the appearance of hollowed eye sockets during certain shots. Details such as open sores, pus balls, and chapped lips were applied to the exposed area around the actor's mouth, in order to imply that the character was suffering from a skin disease. The "Kemper Mask" that the character wears during the scene where he attacks the van was constructed from a cast of the actor Eric Balfour, Stoddard and fellow effects artist Grady Holder would then rip the eye holes open before applying stitches and fake blood onto the design, in order to make it look like it had been peeled off from Kemper's corpse.

Having previously worked on the third film, and the 2003 remake, Nicotero would return to the franchise in The Beginning as the film's lead makeup and effects artist.  Nicotero found creating the design for Leatherface to be particularly challenging, as the look was meant to signify the character's evolution of their iconic mask. Working closely with the filmmakers, Nicotero experimented with various design aspects in order to come up with the look and feel of a Leatherface that had yet to embrace his true monstrous nature. Producer Michael Bay and the film's director Jonathan Liebesman would alternately push for two very different designs; Bay wanted a half-face mask covering the lower portion of the character's face with buckles resembling an old football or football helmet that he had cut up and used as a mask, implementing this design aesthetic a basis for crafting all the other masks he would use in the future. Liebesman however, disliked this idea at first, wanting a mask made from leather that had been "stretched and distressed", completely covering the character's face, which he felt fit the idea that Leatherface started off using animal skins as material for his mask. The idea was discarded by Liebesman, as he realized that covering too much of Bryniarski's face would affect the audience's ability to fully invest in the actor's performance, while also admitting it gave Leatherface "more humanity" by showing the upper portion of his face before the character finally loses his humanity altogether. For the final portion of the film when Leatherface dons his first face mask skinned from Matt Bomer's character, casts were done on the actor's head. The mask itself underwent slight modifications, such as the incorporation of Bomer's hair and facial hair onto the overall design, the former was accomplished by adding two flaps onto the back of the mask, to give off the appearance that Leatherface had skinned the entire head rather than just the face as he would do in later years.

For the 2013 reboot, KNB EFX Group lead by co-founder Howard Berger with the assistance of fellow KNB makeup artist Mike McCarty, were hired to bring the character back to his roots. Working from the earlier screenplay drafts, in which Leatherface was depicted as a more elderly version of the character, concept art by Jerad S. Marantz would emphasize the forty-year time-span between the original film and the new iteration of the character. Details such as Leatherface killing and wearing the faces of senior citizens were incorporated into Marantz's earlier designs. Subsequent rewrites of the original draft would abandon the concept, as Luessenhop wanted a design that looked more "crispy" and resembling something more like tanned leather. In the end, Berger designed three separate masks used by Leatherface in the film: the "Pretty Woman" mask seen at the beginning of the film, the "Comfort" mask, and the "Slaughterhouse" mask, also referred to as the character's "Rage mask" during production. Each mask was molded to fit Yeager's face and given more flexibility than previously created for the character, giving Yeager more freedom to express himself with his face and eyes. The "Pretty Woman" mask was created as an exact replica of the mask seen in the first film using modern-day materials, while the "Slaughterhouse" and "Comfort" masks were both original designs by the KNB EFX team. The "Slaughterhouse" mask was intentionally designed to feel distorted and warped from old age; pieces of facial hair were added to the design to make it look and feel distinct, while granules of salt were mixed into the latex to give it a rough and ridged look. Each design of the new masks was fitted with a pair of leather straps on the back in compliance with Lionsgate's incentive to have something resembling straps from an old boot, also cutting the amount of time the makeup team needed to spend applying and removing the masks. Yeager recalled that it took approximately forty-five minutes to apply makeup for the mask, with fifteen minutes spent removing the mask.

Undergoing a significant departure from previous entries, Lionsgate's 2017 prequel would be the first in the series to depict the character not wearing his iconic face mask throughout most of the film's duration. Only three separate masks, designed by effects artist and filmmaker Olivier Afonso, are briefly depicted over the course of the film. These masks, such as the "Cowhead", muzzle, and the Hartman/Lizzy face mask, were designed to show the evolution of his identity leading up to him donning his first face mask at the end of the film. Afonso would also design the character's look after his face is severed by gunfire.

Filmmakers for the ninth entry in the franchise wanted to take the character back to his roots, opting for an "old school" approach to the film and its iconic character, whom producer Álvarez referred to as "Old Man Leatherface". To that effect, Illusion Industries Inc. founder Todd Tucker and Martin Astles were hired to bring about a new iteration of the character. The design process for the character was particularly difficult due to the intricate design process, with viable effort made create a look for the character that was consistent with the original film, while given the incentive to make the character look as scary as possible. Various design concepts and ideas for Leatherface's new look were discussed, including early concept art by artist Miles Teves depicting what Leatherface would look like without the mask in order to visualize the character as someone who had been "beaten down" over the years since the first film. One of the possible designs for the character involved Leatherface wearing a dress, as a homage to the character's feminine aspect in the original film, however, this was discarded early on in development. Eventually basing their design upon the 'Old Lady' character Ginny, different masks were created using casts made from silicone and sculpted to give the appearance that the face had been "ripped off". Tucker would intentionally design the mask to be drooping and sagging, which gave off a 'sad' look to the character. Tucker would clash with the producers on the design, as producers wanted the look to resemble Michael Myers' mask, as the studio felt this was scarier because of its emotionless appearance. Eventually, Tucker was able to convince the studio of the original design after explaining to them how it worked well with the current state of the character. A total of twenty masks were created and used throughout the course of the film, with five different looks depicting the mask in different states of gore and decay.

Characteristics
Throughout the years, Leatherface has undergone several shifts in personality and motivations following his first appearance in 1974, with each subsequent change largely depending on the filmmaker's vision for the character to various effect. The franchise itself has been known for its inconsistent tone and history, due in part to it frequently changing production rights with various companies, resulting in tonal changes that affected the character and his personality. In his first appearance, Leatherface was characterized as having interchanging personalities depending on which mask he wore, in addition to occasional cross-dressing and themes of sexual ambiguity. Both traits would never be fully explored or revisited in later entries in the franchise, with the exception of The Next Generation. Regardless of these changes, the characterization of Leatherface as an intellectually disabled, and Mentally disturbed individual would be retained in each entry of the franchise. In some appearances, traits such as superhuman strength and resilience were added to the character, though some commentators felt this was an attempt to make the character similar to other more popular popular slashers, such as Halloweens Michael and Friday the 13ths Jason.

Personality
In his original appearance, Leatherface was characterized as having a severe mental disability, incapable of rational thought or coherent speech. Unique among antagonists of the genre, who usually are classified as sadistic or evil; Leatherface is depicted committing his brutal acts out of fear and as a means of following the orders dictated to him by his family, though not out of evil intention. Hansen described Leatherface as someone "completely under the control of his family", while also being afraid of them; going on to explain that, although Leatherface is the most powerful and violent member of his family, he is also the most fearful. Hooper argued on this notion in the documentary Texas Chainsaw Massacre: The Shocking Truth (2001), referring to Leatherface as a 'big baby', and someone genuinely frightened of all the new people entering his home to the point of violence, Hooper stated that he further intended for Leatherface to be frightened by his own violent acts, stating "what he [Leatherface] does scares the hell out of him... he knows he's in trouble—not trouble with the law so much as trouble with his older brother". Fellow horror actor Doug Bradley, of Hellraiser fame, would confide to Hansen during a conversation that he felt Leatherface was something other than 'just a crazed killer'; observing the character's child-like behavior and submissive demeaner in regards to the orders dictated to him by other members of his family, made the character something different than just a 'crazed killer' and more of an obediant child. While the characterization of Leatherface killing out of fear and for the protection of his home, placed the character in a somewhat sympathetic light, commentators have pointed out the character's screams, grunts and squeals imply his mentality as more animal than human. Scenes where Leatherface jabbers and squeals incoherently to Drayton were intended to convey the character's deteriorated mind, as Hooper would explain to Hansen that these noises were words that Leatherface tried to convey, and meant something to him [Leatherface], however, his limited intelligence made him incapable of forming his thoughts into any sort of coherent speech. In spite of his function as the family's enforcer, Leatherface is shown to be somewhat mistreated by his family. As some film scholars have pointed out, Leatherface and Sally's brother Franklyn have certain aspects similar in comparison with one another, to the extent that they functioned as mimetic doubles. Drawing attention to these similarities, scholars have highlighted both characters sharing a crippling disability; Franklyn's physical disability of being confined to a wheelchair, while Leatherface's was more psychological in the sense that he had an intellectual disability; additionally, both characters were the subject of mistreatment by their respective family members. Critic and author Jason Zinoman compared Leatherface's depiction to that of Boris Karloff's performance as Frankenstein's monster, pointing out how each character was able to elicit sympathy while continuing to be a source of dread for the audience. The implied cannibalism of Leatherface and his family in the first film was cited by author and independent filmmaker John Kenneth Muir, who felt the nature of Leatherface's villainy played a prominent part of Hooper's thesis on a warped and cruel universe. Muir viewed part of the character's actions as motivated by survival, viewing his victims as nothing more than meat, "To him, they're all merely ingredients." This sentiment was echoed by filmmaker and scholar Wheeler Winston Dixon, who referred Leatherface as "nothing more than a brute-killing machine who regards the world as one giant abattoir."

In The Texas Chainsaw Massacre 2, which was deliberately more comedic in tone, Leatherface would undergo a coming of age, shedding the feminine personalities that he had in the first film. Screenwriter L. M. Kit Carson's vision for Leatherface would add more depth and detail to the character's mindset, while also exploring his motivations and personality. Actor Johnson would describe the sequel as taking place in a parallel universe, noting that while both his and Hansen's version of the character were from similar worlds, each had significant differences between them to be separate from one another. This transformation of the character's mindset from someone who only saw others as either food or a threat, and thinking only in terms of his family, into developing a potential love interest in the film's female character [Stretch], was viewed by some commentators as a 'maturing' of the character. University of California Professor Carol J. Clover would describe Leatherface before this transition as being "permanently locked in childhood"; only after encountering Stretch, Clover points out, that he seemingly 'comes of age', developing a crush on her which causes him to lose his blood lust. Johnson would echo this sentiment, explaining that, by sparing Stretch, Leatherface transitions from being a killing machine to what he called "the typical American Graffiti life" where he was looking for love instead of out to kill. Johnson further explained that, because of these newfound emotions, Leatherface felt torn between the 'safety' of his family and this "humane" emotion of love.

Leatherface would take on a "rebellious teenage type" mindset in Leatherface: The Texas Chainsaw Massacre III, a contrast to the character's child-like mentality displayed in the original film. Many traits from the original film, such as the character's cross-dressing, and interchangeable personalities while wearing various masks are absent in this rendition of the character, having been discarded early on in early drafts of the script. Although not explicitly stated in the film, Jennifer Banko's character Babi Sawyer was intended to be Leatherface's daughter, via the rape of one of his victims.  to Mama Sawyer's inability to bare children, it is his responsibility in the film to continue the family bloodline. In the film's audio commentary, director Burr offered his own thoughts on the character's mental state, theorizing that Leatherface was reduced to a mindless, voiceless individual by means of a catastrophic injury. Burr surmised that his version of Leatherface was not born mentally impaired, but rather fell victim to an injury which destroyed his ability to think and speak, while also disfiguring his face. This concept of Leatherface's origins was explicitly shown in earlier drafts of the script during a scene where Leatherface is unmasked, hinting that his face might have been skinned off at one point in his life. Northstar Comics' four-part series, loosely based on the third film, would delve even deeper into the character's psyche while abandoning the concept of Leatherface as a brain-damaged individual. Described in the comic as mentally impaired from birth, the series explored the origins for his disturbed and violent behavior, revealing Leatherface as someone who was further damaged by his exposure to, what the comic referred to as "[the] bad things" done to him, pushing him deeper into madness and leaving him with the mind of a 'confused and angry child'. Motivated by an inherent need to please his family, and an almost symbiotic connection to his chainsaw, Leatherface is depicted as prone to bouts of self-harm when his actions are criticized by his family and his usefulness comes into question. This behavior is displayed at one point when his chainsaw is damaged during an encounter with a potential victim, causing him to suffer an emotional breakdown, which culminates with Leatherface beating his head against a tree as a form of self-punishment. The short story "Self-Esteem" by James Kisner, published within the series, revealed additional details on the character's mental state, depicting him as prone to hearing voices inside his head. The third film's interpretation of the character as a brutish, violent killer, as opposed to the more "scared child" persona, would be highly influential on later iterations of the character after Next Generation.

The Next Generation incarnation would mark the most radically different and overtly comedic interpretations of the character. Writer-director Henkel decided upon a satirical approach for the fourth entry in the series, casting a more "androgynous type" actor for the role. Traits only briefly explored in the original film such as the character's cross-dressing, and sexual ambiguity, were implemented to a greater extent in The Next Generation. Instead of being a source of dread as with the previous entries, Leatherface was redefined as a transvestite that dressed in the flesh of female victims, something film scholar Scott Von Doviak referred to as a "tortured drag queen". The three interchanging masks for the character would return for the film, to show off the character's sexually confused and deranged mental state. As actor Jacks explained, each mask represented a different "character" or aspect of Leatherface which he was attempting to express. Jacks would go on to explain that the masks themselves were meant to resemble real-life caricatures of the typical family dynamics, which he claimed was the filmmaker's intention in the original film.

The personality of Leatherface would evolve from that of a frightened child and rebellious teenager into a sadistic, rage-fueled serial killer in Platinum Dunes remake series. Although still mentally disabled, Leatherface is depicted as being more unstable and violent than any previous incarnations of the character, also establishing the character as the primary killer and enforcer for the Hewitt family (the timeline's version of the Sawyer family). Screenwriter Scott Kosar wanted to put his own unique spin on the character, developing the notion of the character having been born with skin cancer, which caused him to be bullied and ridiculed throughout his life; transforming him into 'a raging maniac' who was protected and insulated from the outside world by his family. In contrast to other incarnations of the character, which have depicted Leatherface as child-like in his behavior, Brynuarski stated that Leatherface was fully aware of his murderous actions and violent nature to the point where he enjoyed killing, seeing it as a way of revenge for the way he was treated throughout his life and an outlet for his long-suppressed rage. Marcus Nispel, who helmed the remake, felt Kosar's iteration of the character had answered questions that the original film put forth but never explained; specifically the notion on what motivated character to commit his horrific acts and how a family would support their actions. Wanting to have the character appear as realistic as possible, Nispel decided to incorporate a scene where Leatherface removes his mask, as he felt it showed the audience that there was a man underneath the mask. 

The prequel would delve deeper into the character's backstory and psyche, expanding upon points that were briefly mentioned in the first film. Leatherface is depicted in the prequel as depict him as a victim of a botched abortion, further suffering from a degenerative mental disorder. The character's cancer diagnosis, only briefly mentioned in the previous film, is explored in more detail, revealing the condition of severely disfigured his appearance, accelerated through his penchant towards self-mutilation. According to Brynuarski, Leatherface was tormented as a child due to his appearance which carried on into adulthood, affecting his mind in the process, "In my estimation, Leatherface is like a beaten dog — he was ostracized and ridiculed, and treated harshly by his peers. The psychological damage they inflicted was immense — there's no chance for him." This was further elaborated by Terrence Evans, who played Leatherface's uncle Old Monty, stating, "I think there was a chance Thomas' life could have been different. But the teasing he suffered, coupled with a bad temper, and following Hoyt around like a puppy dog, left room for Hoyt to get absolute control." Bryniarski would also explain how the Hewitt family's "us or them" mentality had influenced the character's violent and psychopathic nature, further noting the abuse he suffered from the outside world for most his life would finally cause his already fragile mind to snap. Unlike other entries in the franchise, Leatherface is depicted as being less abused and mistreated by members of his family, who protect and insulate him from the world and the consequences of his crimes. Wildstorm's comic About a Boy would shed more light on the character's mentality, depicting him as isolated and abused by his fellow classmates, while being obsessed with trapping and skinning dead animals. Members of his family are shown to accept and encourage young Leatherface's disturbed behavior, going so far as to dispose of the mutilated remains of a school bully, whom he had kidnapped and skinned alive.

A continuation of the Hansen iteration of Leatherface appeared in Texas Chainsaw 3D, a 2013 follow-up to the original that ignored the events of the previous sequels. When developing Texas Chainsaw 3D, co-writers Adam Marcus, and Debra Sullivan felt that there was no real mythology for the character and wanted to create their own mythology for the character. As Marcus stated in an interview: "there was no real mythology for Leatherface, and we wanted to create a mythology. With Leatherface, there was a really broken psychology there, like Frankenstein's monster. For Debra and me, we wanted to tell the story of Leatherface's imprisonment and his reverence for family." For Luessenhop, Leatherface represented not only a source of fear, but also one of pity: "Underneath that mask, there's a very damaged, very abused kid whose mental state never evolved". Describing the character's personality, Yeager referred to the character as someone trained most his life to serve a specific function within his family, as that of the killer. Yeager went on to describe Leatherface as having no self-determination, and someone who was afraid of the world outside of his family who "did his thinking for him". After the events at the beginning of the film, Leatherface spends the next twenty years 'fending for himself', with his true individual personality finally "beginning to emerge" from beneath the mask, developing his own identity beyond just wearing someone else's face.  Yeager would also admit that Leatherface had some characteristics that never changed: "He's very childlike still. He plays with stuff like a kid does. His life experience is a bit limited." Critics of the film would point the character's sympathetic and antihero portrayal, as one critic from The Hollywood Reporter would write, the Leatherface in the film was portrayed as "being something of a misunderstood, overgrown child whose propensity for tearing off his victims’ faces is but an extreme example of adolescent rebellion."

The origin story to The Texas Chain Saw Massacre and Texas Chainsaw 3D, would reinvent the character, rescinding the original notion of Leatherface always being mentally disabled, instead depicting him as a mentally disturbed young man who later becomes intellectually disabled once exposed to traumatic events which virtually destroy his mind.  Screenwriter Seth M. Sherwood explained his take on the character as being directly influenced by the mindset described by Hooper and Hansen: "I took my inspiration from interviews, in which they described the psychology of Leatherface. His personality was blank – who he was defined by his mask, and what his family told him to do." Sherwood approached the film as a story of identity, and wanted to delve deeper into why the character became who he was, believing the concept of a Leatherface shaped into a near-mindless monster through events that occur in his life, as opposed to being born that way, to be a more interesting side to the character. As he explained, the young man who would become Leatherface is still 'trying to figure out who he is', having been removed from his birth family, and constantly moved around in foster care. Actor Sam Strike believed that Leatherface was formed by the experiences in the early part of his life; born into a family of psychopaths whose twisted views on the world were impressed upon him at birth, and his later experiences spending most of his childhood in an asylum, describing the character as "a victim of circumstance". This version of Leatherface would depict him as resistant to his family's murderous and sadistic tenancies, while also enduring frequent outbursts of extreme rage. Reflecting on the character's outbursts, Strike felt these moments would contribute to his eventual permanent state as a "rage monster". The character's downfall and descent into madness would also be implemented under the control of his family, specifically his mother, whose manipulation of him would greatly influence the character's transformation.

The ninth entry's interpretation of the character would be noticeably similar to the 'unstoppable evil' of Michael Myers from the Halloween franchise, as filmmakers wanted to emulate the financial success of the 2018 reboot, while also retaining certain elements for the character. Similar to the 2017 portrayal of the character, Leatherface is depicted as relatively normal in appearance, which filmmakers felt was a more interesting explanation as to how the character was able to remain undetected for decades following the original film. One of the main elements retained for Leatherface was his limited mental development, as Garcia would describe his vision for the character: "I don’t think Leatherface is like the rest of us. I don’t think he is fully developed as a human being". Co-writer and producer Alvarez would point out the character's unique personality among horror villains, referring to Leatherface as having a more human aspect to him as opposed to Jason or Michael who were classified as "cold and determined" killers. This iteration of Leatherface would also find a mother figure of sorts in the character Ginny or Mrs. Mc, whose kind influence would help his more violent and murderous tendencies to become dormant for several decades. Once this relative peace is shattered following Ginny's death, his rage and murderous urges are reawakened, causing him to once again embrace the beast within. Although incredibly violent, Leatherface is shown to have a deep affection for Ginny, at one point attempting to apply makeup as a way to "connect" with her after her death. In spite of this, the reiteration of the character was negatively received by critics and fans, whom they felt lacked the character's usual emotional and psychological complexity and depth.

Variants of Leatherface have been represented in various other forms of media, including comic books and video games. Jason vs. Leatherface, a comic book crossover where Jason Voorhees of Friday the 13th meets the Texas Chainsaw family (now identified as the Slaughter family of Sawyerville), represents Leatherface in a childlike emotional state as he is shown to be constantly bullied by his older brother, the Hitchhiker from The Texas Chain Saw Massacre. He befriends Jason, who sympathizes with him. The book puts an emphasis on similarities between the two characters, showing both to be victims of abuse. In spite of the abuse he suffers from his family, Leatherface is shown to love them and have a strong loyalty towards them, even protecting them from Jason after he attempts to murder the Slaughter family for their abuse towards him. Following his inclusion in the sixth chapter of the asymmetric survival horror video game Dead by Daylight, promotional listings referred to him as a frightened child trapped in a man's body, seeking appreciation and acceptance. The game's developers described what they viewed as Leatherface's motivation for killing, which they felt that he killed out of fear, unlike typical horror villains. The official manual for the game, describes Leatherface as having no real will of his own, being solely dependent on his family for "security and safety", executing their orders without question.

Masks

One of the defining characteristics of Leatherface, depicted throughout the entirety of the series, has been his iconic face mask(s). As with the character's real-life inspiration, Ed Gein, Leatherface wears masks made from the faces of his victims. In the original film, Leatherface dons three different masks during certain parts of the film, each representing a different personality at a given point of time, as the character was never intended to have any personality beneath those masks. As Hansen explained, each mask the character wore determined the kind of personality he wanted to emulate, with each of the masks seen in the film representing something important to Leatherface: "He uses the masks to express the context he is in and how he will behavehis state of mind." Elaborating upon this, Hansen would state that each mask was a way for Leatherface to take on a personality or identity he was incapable of expressing on his own, that if one were to remove his mask he would essentially be devoid of any identity or personality. Co-creator Kim Henkel agreed with this assessment, stating that Leatherface "is who he wears", assuming the personality of each of his individual masks. Tobe Hooper felt that the character's alternating personalities while wearing various masks was comparable to Greek tragedy, as to him, wearing a mask was a form of expressing himself in a way he was incapable of doing on his own. In his essay titled The Aesthetics of Fright, Others would put forth their own interpretation on Leatherface's masks, cultural historian and essayist Morris Dickstein compared Leatherface to Michael Myers of the Halloween franchise. Explaining that both characters utilized a mask to obscure their identity, referring to both characters as "murderers in whiteface", while also defining both series as being their own visual signature. The mask-wearing aspect was also viewed by Lorna Piatti-Farnell to be a representation of the evil within humanity, and by literally donning the faces of others, Leatherface is able to personify his own evil inner-nature. In the fourth film of the franchise, Henkel wanted to expand upon the reason for the character's various face masks. When discussing the character, Henkel explained that Leatherface not only chose to wear these different masks to literally become different people other than himself, but also to hide his perceived ugliness. The three masks seen in the film represented three distinct personalities for the character, as effects artist Joshua "J.M." Logan would recall from a conversation with the film's director about the personality of each mask; the Killer mask was worn when taking on the personality of the family's enforcer, the Old Lady mask was the personality of a grandmother taking care of her children, and the Pretty Lady mask was that of someone wanting to be loved.

While filmmakers of each entry in the franchise would maintain the most basic characterization of Leatherface being a blank slate, each proceeding version of the character would completely disregard the concept behind the character's mask(s), instead focusing on the horrific nature of the mask itself. Platinum Dunes' remake series would put forth their own interpretation of the mask; with the mask now representing, as one observer pointed out, all of the primal rage and 'lack of humanity' that existed within the character. Texas Chainsaw 3D actor Dan Yeager described Leatherface as being 'nothing more than a mask', with the masks he wore being 'real' personalities for the character. The masks themselves were also a source of comfort and safety for Leatherface, with makeup artist Mike McCarty describing the "Comfort" mask seen in the film as the equivalent of a "favorite pair of slippers". Filmmakers of the 2013 entry would also add the notion that Leatherface stitches each mask onto his own face, effectively merging himself with each mask's identity.

Cross-dressing and Sexual ambiguity
Film historians and scholars have highlighted Leatherface's characteristic behavior of cross-dressing, and sexual ambiguity in both the original film and some later entries in the franchise. Cross-dressing and feminine aspects of the character were directly influenced by Gein, who had attempted to 'become a woman' through use of a suit crafted from a woman's torso, just as Leatherface takes on the role of the absent mother during the film's climax. The feminine side to the character was noted by Alexandra Heller-Nicholas and Kim Newman as a mockery of traditional familial roles. As both critics would note, donning his "Old Lady" and "Pretty Woman" masks, Leatherface takes on the maternal role and persona in a seemingly all-male family. Further points of interest, such as the abuse Leatherface sustains from his family while in the feminine persona of the "Pretty Woman" mask, was noted by Heller-Nicholas as a transformation of the character from the family's enforcer into a "gendered victim of male violence".

The fourth film would overtly explore the sexual ambiguity of the character and what Henkel called their "feminine and maternal side", as he felt the character's confused sexuality added a layer of complexity to the character's horrific nature. The origins for the character's sexual ambiguity depicted in the original film were considered in the 2017 prequel, with Sherwood revealing that he had originally written in the script where Jedediah is adopted by a family who wanted a little girl, forcing him to wear drag clothing. This plot point did not make it into the final cut of the film after being removed in subsequent drafts. At one point in development, filmmakers even considered leading the audience to believe that Jessica Madsen's character could become Leatherface, "It wasn’t a so crazy idea to have regarding the passion Leatherface had for dresses and makeup in the previous movies."

Legacy

Cultural impact

Since his debut in 1974, Leatherface has gained a reputation as an iconic and influential character in the horror genre, responsible for establishing the use of conventional tools as murder weapons, as well as the image of a large, silent, killer devoid of personality. His trademark face mask, and chainsaw have since become instantly recognizable images in popular culture. Several film historians and critics would note that Leatherface would become a template and inspiration for later slashers such as Jason, Michael, and many others. Author Jim Harper would note that Leatherface continues to be an influence on countless slasher villains following the success of the original film, with the many slashers emerging afterwards attempting to replicate the same shock value associated with the character to limited success.  One of the reasons for the character's lasting popularity was noted by Hansen as due in part that Leatherface was not entirely evil, in contrast to many slasher villains, in addition to the mystery surrounding the character beyond the masks he wore.

Leatherface has been listed by critics and several media publications as one of the greatest horror film villains of all time. As online publication Comic Book Resources would argue, the character is made all the more effective by infusing the character with his real life counterpart, Gein, "in a way that Jason or Freddy could never match". Leatherface was placed at No. 1 for media outlet Thrillist's list of "The 33 Scariest Horror Villains of All Time", with the author describing the character as "the purest cinematic distillation of sudden, random, unspeakable terror". American magazine Alternative Press would name Leatherface as the most terrifying horror villain of all time, in their "27 Iconic Horror Villains". In a reader's poll for Rolling Stone Leatherface was named No. 6 for 10 best horror villains. He was ranked at No. 15 on Empires "The 100 Best Horror Movie Characters". George Wales from GamesRadar ranked Leatherface No. 63 for "100 Greatest Movie Villains of All Time", writing "Whilst the most horrific member of the Chainsaw family is surely the desiccated Grandfather, Leatherface is the icon, and with good reason. From his jarring, animal squeals of rage to the shambling gait, he's a monster in man's (and occasionally women's) clothing." Insider placed him at No. 14 in their "50 Greatest Movie Villains of All Time". Film critic Tim Dirks of the film-review website Filmsite.org would add Leatherface into his list featuring "The Greatest Movie Entrances of All-Time" based on the scene where the character appears and murders Kirk with a hammer.

Leatherface has been produced and marketed as merchandise over the years, with different companies producing their own line often based on the different versions of the character. In 1990 Screamin' Toys produced a model kit where owners could build their own Leatherface statuette. The kit, which came with a standard chainsaw accessory, would also include a customization kit to create the 'Excalibur' chainsaw from the third film. The kit is now out of production and considered extremely rare. In 1998, McFarlane Toys introduced the Movie Maniacs line of figures, with their Series One figures including Leatherface which was released in September of that year. McFarlane produced three additional toy lines of the character, the first in 2001, with the final two in 2004. All of the toy lines the company produced featuring the character would be a part of their Movie Maniacs series, the final two based upon the 2004 remake version of the character. A mini-bust of Leatherface, in addition to several action figures was produced by NECA from 2016 to 2019. NECA would later debut an 8-inch retro-style Texas Chainsaw Massacre III Leatherface action figure at Toy Fair 2017. In March 2015, Hollywood Collectibles released a 20-inch action figure, based on Yeager's portrayal of the character. On November 2020, Japanese toy and hobby company Kotobukiya released a gender-bended version of the character, as a part of their "Horror Bishōjo" series of toys, featuring other gender-swapped versions of popular horror characters. From the start of 2021, Sideshow Collectibles produced their own line of Leatherface merchandise, the first being a 12.6 inch statue designed by Kotobukiya.

Several artistic and entertainment mediums have referenced or featured the character throughout the years. Leatherface was included as a cosmetic in the video games Call of Duty: Modern Warfare and Call of Duty: Warzone. The character was one of several horror icons to be included in Universal Studios theme parks Halloween Horror Nights event in a maze titled "The Texas Chainsaw Massacre: Blood Brothers". In 2014, illustrator Travis Falligant included Leatherface in "Scooby-Doo: Lost Mysteries", a parody series of art pieces featuring Scooby-Doo and the gang facing off against various horror villains. A Leatherface-themed jacket, loafers, and boots were designed and produced by Urban Outraged, in a campaign funded by PETA in order to raise awareness.

Influence
The character has been referenced and made cameo appearances, in various entertainment mediums He is referenced several times in Bret Easton Ellis' novel American Psycho. At one point, the novel's protagonist Patrick Bateman mistakenly refers to the character as "Featherhead". Bateman's murder of Christie with a chainsaw in both the novel and the film adaption can be seen as an homage to the character. A popular internet myth centered on the 2004 game Grand Theft Auto: San Andreas would claim that Leatherface could be found at a special location in the game.

Leatherface has often been referenced or parodied in other films. Leatherface would first appear in the 1988 Merrie Melodies animated short The Night of the Living Duck, as one of the patrons of a nightclub catered to monsters in Daffy Duck's dream. In its 1988 sequel, Sleepaway Camp II: Unhappy Campers, the series' antagonist Angela Johnson dresses up in a Leatherface costume while murdering several people. The 1989 comedy film Transylvania Twist would feature a parody of Leatherface, alongside Jason and Freddy Krueger in the film's prologue where they all chase down and subsequently defeated by a young woman, remarking that they are "amateurs". The 2005 television movie Bloodsuckers depicts a clan of vampires called the "Leatherfaces", as an homage to the character. The title character in the 2005 film Andre the Butcher, was often be negatively compared to Leatherface due to his semblance to the character. A adult parody film released in 2008 titled The Texas Vibrator Massacre would feature a version of the character, who would use a gas-powered vibrator in place of his signature chainsaw. In the 2009 horror comedy Stan Helsing, the character 'Pleatherface' was designed as a spoof of Leatherface, wielding a leaf blower instead of a chainsaw.

Leatherface has also been referenced and parodied by several television shows. The stop motion animated television series Robot Chicken would include Leatherface in four of its comedy sketches. In episode nineteen, "That Hurts Me", Leatherface would be along several other horror film icons Jason, Ghostface, Freddy, Pinhead, and Michael Myers as they participate in the reality television show Big Brother. Leatherface later made a brief appearance as a background character in the episode "Botched Jewel Heist" in the sketch "Horror Friends Forever". In "Scoot to the Gute", Leatherface appears in the sketch "American Pickers Texas", where he is a guest star on the reality television show American Pickers. He would last appear in the episode "Jew No. 1 Opens a Treasure Chest", where he is briefly seen alongside Jason in the sketch "Jason's Terrible, Horrible, No Good Day". The South Park episodes "Imaginationland Episode II" and "III" features Leatherface among a vast assortment of other villains and monsters as an inhabitant of the "bad side" of Imaginationland, a world populated by fictional characters.

Many musical artists have made references to Leatherface, with some also citing the character as a major source of inspiration for their works. The 1984 single "Too Much Blood" written by Mick Jagger and Keith Richards from their band The Rolling Stones, was partially influenced by the original film and referenced the character in its lyrics. Inspired by their love for the original film, Frankie Stubbs and Dickie Hammond would found the British punk rock band Leatherface, taking their name from the character. American death metal band Mortician would base their 1997  and 1999 songs "Hacked Up for Barbecue", and "Chainsaw Dismemberment" upon the character. American punk rock band Ramones would base their song "Chain Saw" in their 1976 album on the character after viewing the original film. The song "Leatherface" by thrash metal band Lääz Rockit was released to promote Leatherface: The Texas Chainsaw Massacre III. Slipknot band member Corey Taylor would don a mask inspired by Leatherface's iconic face mask for the band's 2004 album, "Vol. 3: (The Subliminal Verses)". Song artist Paul Roland would pay homage to the character in his 2008 album "Nevermore". Rapper 21 Savage would feature the character in the music video of his song "Glock in My Lap". 

Several professional wrestlers have used the Leatherface moniker as their gimmick during their wrestling careers. During his brief stint in New Japan Pro-Wrestling from 1989-1990, Michael Kirchner would use the moniker Leatherface. Now retired wrestler professional wrestler Dennis Knight would also take on the name Leatherface during a brief stint in 1991, going so far as to even dress up as the character during rounds. In 2012, Japanese wrestler Makoto would debut her masked persona "Lady Face" which was inspired by Leatherface. Bray Wyatt, well known for using multiple gimmicks inspired by film and television characters, would wear a butcher outfit during matches which were directly inspired by the character.

Leatherface has been a source of inspiration for various fictional characters throughout the decades. Capcom's Resident Evil video game series would base the designs of several of their characters on Leatherface. In Resident Evil 4 (2005), enemies such as the Chainsaw Men and Chainsaw Sisters, and more importantly Dr. Salvador has been noted by observers as being heavily influenced by Leatherface. In Resident Evil 7: Biohazard (2017), the game's Baker family was noted by many as a homage to and inspired by Leatherface and the Sawyer family. Tatsuki Fujimoto, the creator of the hit manga series Chainsaw Man, revealed during the tenth-anniversary celebration of the animation studio MAPPA, that Leatherface and the original Texas Chainsaw Massacre as the main source of inspiration for the series and its titular character. Actor Michael Cerveris would compare his character, Professor Pyg, in Gotham, to Leatherface, particularly his mask, apron, and straps. In American Horror Story: Roanoke, the character Bloody Face was partially inspired by Leatherface. Makeup artist Christien Tinsley revealed in an interview that the show's creator Ryan Murphy gave Tinsley's makeup department the task of creating something unique and original with Bloody Face that had characteristics of Leatherface in the design whom he referred to as "my Leatherface".

See also
 Chainsaws in popular culture

Notes

References

Sources

Books

Periodicals

Media

Documentaries and interviews

Film and television

Further reading
 
 
 
 

Adoptee characters in films
Fictional amputees
Fictional butchers
Fictional cannibals
Fictional characters based on real people
Fictional characters from Texas
Fictional characters with cancer
Fictional characters with disfigurements
Fictional characters with intellectual disability
Fictional characters with neurotrauma
Fictional characters with psychiatric disorders
Fictional characters with post-traumatic stress disorder
Fictional characters with superhuman strength
Fictional cross-dressers
Fictional kidnappers
Fictional mass murderers
Fictional melee weapons practitioners
Fictional serial killers
Film characters introduced in 1974
Male horror film villains
Orphan characters in film
Slasher film antagonists
The Texas Chainsaw Massacre (franchise) characters